Melvin & Dollie Younts Stadium is a 5,000-capacity multi-use stadium located in Tigerville, South Carolina on the campus of North Greenville University where it serves as home to the school's football program.

External links
 NGU Facilities

College football venues
Sports venues in Greenville County, South Carolina
Sports venues in South Carolina
North Greenville Crusaders football